is a large trans-Neptunian object from the scattered disc located in the outermost region of the Solar System. It is one of the most distant objects from the Sun at 60.5 AU. It was discovered by astronomers with the Canada–France Ecliptic Plane Survey at Mauna Kea Observatories, Hawaii, when it was near aphelion on 31 August 2003. It was provisionally designated .

Orbit and classification 

 orbits the Sun at a distance of 37.7–62.2 AU once every 353 years and 1 month (128,966 days; semi-major axis of 49.96 AU). Its orbit has an eccentricity of 0.25 and an inclination of 7° with respect to the ecliptic.

It is classified as a scattered disc object, or "near-scattered" object in the classification of the Deep Ecliptic Survey, that still gravitationally interacts with Neptune (30.1 AU) due to its relatively low perihelion of 37.7 AU, contrary to the extended-scattered/detached objects and sednoids which never approach Neptune as close. It has also been described as a "detached classical belt object" by the discovering Canada–France Ecliptic Plane Survey (CFEPS), that are objects with a semi-major axis beyond the 2:1 mean-motion resonance (i.e. beyond the twotino population at 47.8 AU) and with an eccentricity larger than 0.24. It was furthest object discovered in CFEPS.

Most distant objects from the Sun 

 last came to perihelion around 1882, moving away from the Sun ever since and is currently about 60.5 AU from the Sun, which is further away than the dwarf planet , and will reach its aphelion around 2058. Its current distance makes it one of the most distant known minor planets in the Solar System (also see ).

Physical characteristics 

, no rotational lightcurve for this object has been obtained from photometric observations. The body's rotation period, pole and shape remain unknown.

See also 
 List of Solar System objects most distant from the Sun
 
 Eris (dwarf planet)

References

External links 
 List Of Centaurs and Scattered-Disk Objects, Minor Planet Center
 What is the most distant body in the Solar System? A historical view (Michael Richmond)
 
 

612584
612584

612584
20030831